Zazel may refer to:
 Zazel, the stage name of circus performer Rossa Matilda Richter (1860–1937), the first human cannonball
 Zazel: The Scent of Love, erotic art film 1997
 Zazel (spirit), demon of Saturn in magic
 Zazel, character in the William Blake poem, Tiriel
 Zazel, song by the Bar Kokhba Sextet on the album, Lucifer: Book of Angels Volume 10
 Zazel Pierce, a character played by Margot Kidder in the 1970 film Quackser Fortune Has a Cousin in the Bronx

See also
Azazel, a biblical fallen angel
Zazzle, an American online marketplace